Åge Nordkild (19 September 1951 – 28 December 2015) was a Norwegian Sami politician. He represented the Norwegian Sami Association. He held several positions in the Sami Parliament from 2001 to 2005 and 2009 to 2013. He was born in Narvik.

Nordkild died in 2015 at the age of 64.

References

1951 births
2015 deaths
Members of the Sámi Parliament of Norway
Nordland politicians
Norwegian Sámi people
People from Narvik